William Grant Still Jr. (May 11, 1895 – December 3, 1978) was an American composer of nearly two hundred works, including five symphonies, four ballets, nine operas, over thirty choral works, plus art songs, chamber music and works for solo instruments. Born in Mississippi, he grew up in Little Rock, Arkansas, attended Wilberforce University and Oberlin Conservatory of Music, and was a student of George Whitefield Chadwick and later, Edgard Varèse. Because of his close association and collaboration with prominent African-American literary and cultural figures, Still is considered to have been part of the Harlem Renaissance.

Often referred to as the "Dean of Afro-American Composers," Still was the first American composer to have an opera produced by the New York City Opera. Still is known primarily for his first symphony, Afro-American Symphony (1930), which was, until 1950, the most widely performed symphony composed by an American. Also of note, Still was the first African-American to conduct a major American symphony orchestra, the first to have a symphony (which was, in fact, the first one he composed) performed by a leading orchestra, the first to have an opera performed by a major opera company, and the first to have an opera performed on national television.

Life 
William Grant Still Jr. was born on May 11, 1895, in Woodville, Mississippi. He was the son of two teachers, Carrie Lena ( Fambro) Shepperson (1872–1927) and William Grant Still Sr. (1871–1895). His father was a partner in a grocery store and performed as a local bandleader. William Grant Still Sr. died when his infant son was three months old.

Still's mother moved with him to Little Rock, Arkansas, where she taught high school English. She met and in 1904 married Charles B. Shepperson, who nurtured his stepson William's musical interests by taking him to operettas and buying Red Seal recordings of classical music, which the boy greatly enjoyed. The two attended a number of performances by musicians on tour. His maternal grandmother Anne Fambro sang African-American spirituals to him.

Still started violin lessons in Little Rock at the age of 15. He taught himself to play the clarinet, saxophone, oboe, double bass, cello and viola, and showed a great interest in music. At 16 years old, he graduated as class valedictorian from M. W. Gibbs High School in Little Rock in 1911.

His mother wanted him to go to medical school, so Still pursued a Bachelor of Science degree program at Wilberforce University, a historically black college in Ohio. Still became a member of Kappa Alpha Psi fraternity. He conducted the university band, learned to play various instruments, and started to compose and to do orchestrations. He left Wilberforce without graduating.

Upon receiving a small amount of money left to him by his father, he began studying at the Oberlin Conservatory of Music. Still worked for the school assisting the janitor, along with a few other small jobs outside of the school, yet still struggled financially. When Professor Lehmann asked Still why he wasn't studying composition, Still told him honestly that he couldn't afford to, leading to George Andrews agreeing to teach him composition without charge. He also studied privately with the modern French composer Edgard Varèse and the American composer George Whitefield Chadwick.

On October 4, 1915, Still married Grace Bundy, whom he had met while they were both at Wilberforce. They had a son, William III, and three daughters, Gail, June, and Caroline. They separated in 1932 and divorced February 6, 1939. On February 8, 1939, he married pianist Verna Arvey, driving to Tijuana for the ceremony because interracial marriage was illegal in California. They had a daughter, Judith Anne, and a son, Duncan. Still's granddaughter is journalist Celeste Headlee, a daughter of Judith Anne.

On December 1, 1976, his home was designated Los Angeles Historic-Cultural Monument #169. It is located at 1262 Victoria Avenue in Oxford Square, Los Angeles.

Career 

In 1916, Still worked in Memphis for W.C. Handy's band. In 1918 Still joined the United States Navy to serve in World War I. After the war he went to Harlem, where he continued to work for Handy. During his time in Harlem Still was involved with other important cultural figures of the Harlem Renaissance such as Langston Hughes, Alain Locke, Arna Bontemps, and Countee Cullen, and is considered to be part of that movement.

He recorded with Fletcher Henderson's Dance Orchestra in 1921, and later played in the pit orchestra for Noble Sissle and Eubie Blake's musical, Shuffle Along and in other pit orchestras for Sophie Tucker, Artie Shaw, and Paul Whiteman. With Henderson, he joined Henry Pace's Pace Phonograph Company (Black Swan). Later in the 1920s, Still served as the arranger of "Yamekraw", a "Negro Rhapsody" (1930), composed by the Harlem stride pianist James P. Johnson.

In the 1930s, Still worked as an arranger of popular music, writing for Willard Robison's Deep River Hour and Paul Whiteman's Old Gold Show, both popular NBC Radio broadcasts.

Still's first major orchestral composition, Symphony No. 1 "Afro-American", was performed in 1931 by the Rochester Philharmonic, conducted by Howard Hanson. It was the first time the complete score of a work by an African American was performed by a major orchestra. By the end of World War II the piece had been performed in New York, Chicago, Los Angeles, Berlin, Paris, and London. Until 1950 the symphony was the most popular of any composed by an American. Still developed a close professional relationship with Hanson; many of Still's compositions were performed for the first time in Rochester.

In 1934, Still moved to Los Angeles. He received his first Guggenheim Fellowship and started work on the first of his nine operas, Blue Steel.

In 1936, Still conducted the Los Angeles Philharmonic Orchestra at the Hollywood Bowl; he was the first African American to conduct a major American orchestra in a performance of his own works.

Still arranged music for films. These included Pennies from Heaven (the 1936 film starring Bing Crosby and Madge Evans) and Lost Horizon (the 1937 film starring Ronald Colman, Jane Wyatt and Sam Jaffe). For Lost Horizon, he arranged the music of Dimitri Tiomkin. Still was also hired to arrange the music for the 1943 film Stormy Weather, but left the assignment because "Twentieth-Century Fox 'degraded colored people.'"

Still composed Song of a City for the 1939 World's Fair in New York City. The song played continuously during the fair by the exhibit "Democracity." According to Still's granddaughter, he couldn't attend the fair except on "Negro Day" without police protection.

In 1949, his opera Troubled Island, originally completed in 1939, about Jean-Jacques Dessalines and Haiti, was performed by the New York City Opera. It was the first opera by an American to be performed by that company and the first by an African American to be performed by a major company. Still was upset by the negative reviews it received.

In 1955, he conducted the New Orleans Philharmonic Orchestra; he was the first African American to conduct a major orchestra in the Deep South. Still's works were performed internationally by the Berlin Philharmonic Orchestra, the London Symphony Orchestra, the Tokyo Philharmonic Orchestra, and the BBC Orchestra.

In 1981, the opera A Bayou Legend was the first by an African-American composer to be performed on national television.

Still was known as the "Dean of Afro-American Composers". Still and Arvey's papers are held by the University of Arkansas.

Legacy and honors 
Still received three Guggenheim Fellowships in music composition (1934, 1935, 1938), at least one Rosenwald Fellowship, and a Mu Phi Epsilon Citation of Merit.
In 1949, he received a citation for Outstanding Service to American Music from the National Association for American Composers and Conductors
In 1976, his home in Los Angeles was designated a Historic-Cultural Monument.
He was awarded honorary doctorates from Oberlin College, Wilberforce University, Howard University, Bates College, the University of Arkansas, Pepperdine University, the New England Conservatory of Music, the Peabody Conservatory in Baltimore, and the University of Southern California.
He was posthumously awarded the 1982 Mississippi Institute of Arts and Letters award for music composition for his opera A Bayou Legend.

Selected compositions 
Still composed almost 200 works, including nine operas, five symphonies, four ballets, plus art songs, chamber music, and works for solo instruments. He composed more than thirty choral works. Many of his works are believed to be lost.

Saint Louis Blues (comp.W.C.Handy; arr. Still; 1916)
Hesitating Blues (comp.W.C.Handy; arr. Still; 1916)
From the Land of Dreams (1924)
Darker America (1924)
From the Journal of a Wanderer (1925)
Levee Land (1925)
From The Black Belt (1926)
La Guiablesse (1927)
Yamekaw, a Negro Rhapsody (comp.J.P. Johnson; arr. Still; 1928)
Sahdji (1930)
Africa (1930)
  Symphony No. 1 "Afro-American" (1930, revised in 1969)
A Deserted Plantation (1933)
The Sorcerer (1933)
Dismal Swamp (1933)
Blue Steel (1934)
Kaintuck' (1935)
 Three Visions (1935)
 Summerland (1935)
A Song A Dust (1936)
  Symphony No. 2, "Song of A New Race" (1937)
Lenox Avenue (1937)
Song of A City (1938)
Seven Traceries (1939)
And They Lynched Him on A Tree (1940)
Miss Sally's Party (1940)
Can'tcha line 'em, for orchestra (1940)
Old California (1941)
Troubled Island, opera, produced 1949 (1937–39)
A Bayou Legend, opera (1941)
Plain-Chant for America (1941)
Incantation and Dance (1941)
A Southern Interlude (1942)
In Memoriam: The Colored Soldiers Who Died for Democracy (1943)
Suite for Violin & Piano (1943)
Festival Overture (1944)
Poem for Orchestra (1944)
Bells (1944)
  Symphony No. 5, "Western Hemisphere" (1945, revised 1970)
From The Delta (1945)
Wailing Woman (1946)
Archaic Ritual Suite (1946)
  Symphony No. 4, "Autochthonous" (1947)
Danzas de Panama (1948)
From A Lost Continent (1948)
Wood Notes (1948)
Miniatures (1948)
Songs of Separation (©1949)
Constaso (1950)
To You, America (1951)
Grief, originally titled as Weeping Angel (1953)
The Little Song That Wanted To Be A Symphony (1954)
A Psalm for The Living (1954)
Rhapsody (1954)
The American Scene (1957)
Serenade (1957)
Ennanga (1958)
  Symphony No. 3, "The Sunday Symphony" (1958)
Lyric Quartette (1960)
Patterns (1960)
The Peaceful Land (1960)
Preludes (1962)
Highway 1, USA (1962)
Folk Suite No. 4 (1963)
Threnody: In Memory of Jan Sibelius (1965)
Little Red School House (1967)
Little Folk Suite (1968)
Choreographic Prelude (1970)

See also 
 Black conductors
 List of African-American composers
 William L. Dawson
 W. C. Handy
 James P. Johnson
 Florence Price
 List of jazz-influenced classical compositions
 Samuel Coleridge-Taylor, early Black British composer

References

Sources 

 Horne, Aaron. Woodwind Music of Black Composers, Greenwood Press, 1990. 
 Roach, Hildred. Black American Music. Past and Present, second edition, Krieger Publishing Company 1992.  
 Sadie, Stanley; Hitchcock, H. Wiley. The New Grove Dictionary of American Music, Grove's Dictionaries of Music, 1986.

Further reading 

Reef, Catherine (2003). William Grant Still:  African American Composer. Morgan Reynolds. 
Sewell, George A., and Margaret L. Dwight (1984). William Grant Still: America's Greatest Black Composer. Jackson:  University Press of Mississippi
Southern, Eileen (1984). William Grant Still – Trailblazer. Fayetteville: University of Arkansas Press.
Still, Verna Arvey (1984). In One Lifetime. Fayetteville: University of Arkansas Press.
Still, Judith Anne (2006). Just Tell the Story. The Master Player Library.
Still, William Grant (2011). My Life My Words, a William Grant Still autobiography. The Master Player Library.

External links 
 William Grant Still, Music, Official Site
 William Grant Still, Music at the Internet Movie Database (IMDb)
  William Grant Still, Bibliography, at the Encyclopedia of Arkansas
 William Grant Still, A Study in Contradictions, University of California
 William Grant Still, Interview (1949; 30:49), radio broadcast by Voice of America

 William Grant Still, "Composer, Arranger, Conductor & Oboist". Extensive information at AfriClassical.com
 William Grant Still and Verna Arvey Papers, University of Arkansas, Special Collections Department, Manuscript Collection MC 1125

1895 births
1978 deaths
20th-century African-American musicians
20th-century American composers
20th-century American conductors (music)
20th-century American male musicians
20th-century classical composers
African-American classical composers
American classical composers
African-American conductors (music)
African-American male classical composers
African-American opera composers
American classical oboists
American male classical composers
American male conductors (music)
American music arrangers
Harlem Renaissance
Jazz-influenced classical composers
Male oboists
Male opera composers
Musicians from Little Rock, Arkansas
Musicians from Mississippi
Oberlin College alumni
Orchestra leaders
People from Woodville, Mississippi
Pupils of Edgard Varèse
Wilberforce University alumni